Louis Serre  (17 August 1873 – 8 January 1939) was  a French industrialist and politician.

Biography
Louis Serre was born 17 August 1873 in Lagnes. He was educated at the college of Carpentras and was on the faculty of the Paris Law Faculty. He was MP for Vaucluse 1914 to 1919 under the Parti républicain, radical et radical-socialiste (RRRS) and Senator of Vaucluse from 1920 to 1936 under the Gauche démocratique (GD). He was Minister of Trade and Industry from 31 January to 26 October 1933 under the government of Édouard Daladier. He died 8 January 1939 in Avignon.

References

1873 births
1939 deaths
People from Vaucluse
Politicians from Provence-Alpes-Côte d'Azur
Radical Party (France) politicians
French Ministers of Commerce and Industry
Members of the 11th Chamber of Deputies of the French Third Republic
French Senators of the Third Republic
Senators of Vaucluse